Lee Vickers (born March 13, 1981) is a former American football tight end. He was signed by the Pittsburgh Steelers as an undrafted free agent in 2006. He played college football at North Alabama.

Vickers has also played for the Philadelphia Eagles, Baltimore Ravens, New York Giants  and Washington Redskins. He later played for the Omaha Nighthawks of the United Football League

Early years
Vickers attended Athens High School in Alabama and was part of the team who went to the state playoffs three years in a row.   It was there he was high school teammates with former Los Angeles Chargers quarterback Philip Rivers. After graduation, he accepted a scholarship to Calhoun Community College to play baseball. He then transferred to the University of North Alabama to play football.

College career
Vickers played college football at North Alabama where during his four-year career posted 67 tackles and 13.5 sacks. He majored in professional biology.

Professional career

First stint with Steelers
Vickers was originally signed by the Pittsburgh Steelers as a rookie free agent on May 9, 2006. However, he was later waived by the team.

Philadelphia Eagles
Vickers was picked up by the Philadelphia Eagles on September 19, 2006. He spent a brief period on the active roster but never got any playing time and was waived.

Baltimore Ravens
Vickers was signed by the Baltimore Ravens as a free agent on September 26, 2007. He played in nine games making two receptions for four yards. He was released from the Ravens on August 12, 2008.

Second stint with Steelers
On August 16, 2008, Vickers re-signed with the Steelers and was released on August 30, 2008.

New York Giants
Vickers was signed by the New York Giants on March 4, 2009. He was waived on September 1.

Washington Redskins
On January 5, 2010, Vickers was signed to a reserve/future contract by the Washington Redskins.

Omaha Nighthawks
Vickers was signed by the Omaha Nighthawks in 2010. He was re-signed by the team on July 15, 2011.

References

External links
Just Sports stats
Pittsburgh Steelers bio

1981 births
Living people
People from Athens, Alabama
Players of American football from Alabama
American football tight ends
North Alabama Lions football players
Pittsburgh Steelers players
Philadelphia Eagles players
Baltimore Ravens players
New York Giants players
Washington Redskins players
Omaha Nighthawks players